Paule Herreman (1919 – 3 October 1991) was a Belgian actress and television presenter for RTBF.

Herreman started her television as chief television announcer.  In 1954 she joined INR to work with Eurovision.  Herreman would continue to maintain her connections to Eurovision, providing the French language commentary for RTBF viewers on 10 occasions for the Eurovision Song Contest between the years of 1959 and 1979. She also commentated for RTBF viewers at the Jeux Sans Frontières between 1965 and 1982.

As an actress Herreman played very small roles in films such as L'Œuvre au noir and Blueberry Hill; she also appeared in the music video to Break It Up featuring American athlete Carl Lewis.

External links
  A Portrait of Paule Herreman
 

1919 births
1991 deaths
Belgian television presenters
Belgian film actresses
20th-century Belgian actresses
Belgian women television presenters